Roscoe Streyle is a Republican politician who represented North Dakota's 3rd district in the North Dakota House of Representatives from 2011 to 2018. Streyle is a banker from Minot. He did not run for reelection in the 2018 election.

In January 2018, Streyle angered disability advocates by using the epithet libtard to describe a fellow Twitter user.

Streyle is married with two children.

References

Living people
Republican Party members of the North Dakota House of Representatives
People from Minot, North Dakota
21st-century American politicians
Year of birth missing (living people)